Rock rattlesnake may refer to:

 Crotalus horridus, a.k.a. the timber rattlesnake, a venomous pitviper species found in the eastern United States
 Crotalus lepidus, a.k.a. the blue rattlesnake, a venomous pitviper species found in the southwestern United States and northern central Mexico

Animal common name disambiguation pages